Thriambeutes is a genus of horse flies in the family Tabanidae.

Species
Thriambeutes melanochrysa Zeegers, 2017
Thriambeutes mesembrinoides (Surcouf, 1908)
Thriambeutes nigripennis (Enderlein, 1922)
Thriambeutes singularis Grünberg, 1906
Thriambeutes v-album (Surcouf, 1908)

References

Brachycera genera
Tabanidae
Diptera of Africa
Taxa named by Karl Grünberg